Mount Multnomah is an invalidated hypothetical ancient volcano postulated in a 1925 publication by geologist Edwin T. Hodge. It was proposed to exist in central Oregon at the present day location of the Three Sisters region.

In 1924, Hodge performed fieldwork around the area and concluded that the three adjacent volcanoes and their foothills were once part of a single giant volcano. His conclusion was bolstered by oral history from the local Warm Springs tribe, which recounted the massive eruption and collapse of the ancient peak:

The date of eruption that Hodge calculated using the potassium-argon method was 25 million to 27 million years ago. This predates the earliest estimates of human presence in North America (see Settlement of the Americas) and even the earliest known humans (see Archaic Homo sapiens) by millions of years.

Years later, Howel Williams, then dean of Cascade volcanologists, concluded that each of the Three Sisters and their surrounding mountains were unique and did not represent remains of a single collapsed structure.

See also 
 Supervolcano

References 

 
 

Cascade Range
Natural history of Oregon